Enrique Briones Pérez (born 4 September 1962) is a Spanish lightweight rower. He won a gold medal at the 1983 World Rowing Championships in Duisburg with the lightweight men's eight. He also competed in the men's coxless four event at the 1988 Summer Olympics.

References

1962 births
Living people
Spanish male rowers
World Rowing Championships medalists for Spain
Olympic rowers of Spain
Rowers at the 1988 Summer Olympics
20th-century Spanish people